Keratin 126 pseudogene is a protein that in humans is encoded by the KRT126P gene.

References